Michael Bettes (born January 9, 1972) is an American television meteorologist and storm chaser who works for The Weather Channel in Atlanta, Georgia. He was a co-host of AMHQ: America's Morning Headquarters. He hosts Weather Underground TV. Bettes has been an on-camera meteorologist for TWC since 2003, and is also an occasional fill-in weather anchor on The Today Show.

Bettes hosted Abrams & Bettes Beyond the Forecast from 2006 to 2009, and Your Weather Today from 2009 to 2012. When it was relaunched as Morning Rush, he hosted it into 2014. The program was relaunched again in March of that year as America's Morning Headquarters. Bettes also formerly hosted Wake Up With Al, from (2009–2014). Bettes is a field reporter for The Weather Channel and is lead field meteorologist for The Great Tornado Hunt, the annual show that summarizes the nation's tornado seasons, .

Bettes accompanied scientists for TWC coverage of VORTEX2. He also has reported live from Hurricane Katrina, Hurricane Sandy, and other tropical cyclones, as well as floods and winter storms.

He was caught in the EF3 (Previously EF5) tornado on May 31, 2013 in El Reno, Oklahoma, but survived; at least four people died that day. A year later, he and his crew returned to the Great Plains to forecast and report severe weather as part of the 2014 Tornado Track.

Early life and education, early career   
Born in Tallmadge, Ohio in 1972, Bettes attended local schools when growing up. He graduated with a B.S. in atmospheric sciences from Ohio State University (OSU).

He worked as chief meteorologist for WLOS in Asheville, North Carolina, and as weekend meteorologist at WSYX/WTTE in Columbus, Ohio and WKEF/WRGT in Dayton, Ohio. Following that, he started work for The Weather Channel.

Tornado incident
Bettes was one of several storm chasers struck by an EF3 tornado in El Reno, Oklahoma in 2013. The storm rolled and tossed his SUV approximately  into a field. The roof collapsed and his crew suffered major injuries: driver Austin Anderson broke several bones. They were later found by Reed Timmer and his SRV Dominator team, who were storm chasing for Oklahoma City's KFOR-TV when they spotted Bettes' wrecked SUV, and saw The Weather Channel markings on it. They stopped to assist Oklahoma Highway Patrol and other first responders, but had to leave to escape the back end of the storm.

In another incident, the same tornado killed TWISTEX storm chasers Tim Samaras, his son Paul, and colleague Carl Young of South Lake Tahoe, California. Amateur storm chaser Dan Robinson of St. Louis, Missouri escaped the tornado with a few injuries. He was a few hundred yards ahead of the TWISTEX crew. Local resident Richard Charles Henderson was killed in the same area as the TWISTEX crew after deciding to chase the storm. Henderson had sent a picture of the twister to a friend using his cell phone just before the storm struck him. Billy Prater, a University of Oklahoma student, together with his father and a friend, sought refuge under an overpass when the storm changed direction (such action is strongly discouraged in these situations). They were lucky to survive.

Career timeline
19??—1998: WSYX/WTTE weekend meteorologist
1998–2003: WLOS chief meteorologist 
2003–present: The Weather Channel
2003–present: Field reporter
2006–2009: Abrams & Bettes: Beyond the Forecast co-host
2009: Weather Center Live co-host
2009–2014: Wake Up With Al segment correspondent and fill-anchor
2009–2012: Your Weather Today co-host
2012–2014: Morning Rush co-host
March 2014–January 23, 2015: America's Morning Headquarters co-host
August 2015–present: Weather Underground TV
2007–present: NBC News
2007–present: The Today Show fill-in weather anchor
2007–present: Special reporter

Personal life
Bettes is married to Allison Chinchar, a freelance CNN meteorologist.

See also
 List of personalities on The Weather Channel

References

External links
 Twitter account
 Facebook page
 

1972 births
Living people
American television meteorologists
The Weather Channel people
Storm chasers
American television journalists
Ohio State University College of Arts and Sciences alumni
People from Sandy Springs, Georgia
American male journalists
People from Tallmadge, Ohio